Gertrude Samuels (1910 – 2003) was a photojournalist and later a member of the editorial board of The New York Times.  In the later position she was a major supporter of international conventions against genocide.

Samuels was born in Manchester, England, and immigrated to the United States at age 14.  She attended George Washington University before joining the New York Post staff in 1937.  She later earned a bachelor's and master's degree from New York University.

Sources
New York Times obituary for Samuels

1910 births
2003 deaths
British emigrants to the United States
George Washington University alumni
New York University alumni
American women journalists
American photojournalists
20th-century American journalists